Frühroter Veltliner is a variety of early-ripening, red-skinned white wine grape grown primarily in the Weinviertel district of Lower Austria.  It accounts for 0.9% of total Austrian vineyards and is diminishing.

Frühroter Veltliner is not at all related to Grüner Veltliner, but is a spontaneous cross between Roter Veltliner and Silvaner. It is not particularly demanding of its location and is resistant to both winter and late frosts.  However, it ripens very early producing wines of neutral bouquet, high alcohol and somewhat low acidity.

It is rarely encountered in the Rheinhessen of Germany, in some older vineyards of Alto Adige in Italy, and in the Savoie of France.

Synonyms
Austria: Früher Roter Veltliner, MalvasierFrance: Malvoisie Rouge d'Italie, Rose d'ItalieGermany: Frühroter Malvasier, Roter MalvasierItaly: VeltlinerCzech: Veltlínské Červené RanéSlovak: Veltlínske Červené Skoré

See also
 Austrian wine

References

External links
 Grape varieties in Austria: Frühroter Veltliner  Wines from Austria
   Weinviertel DAC
   Vitis International Variety Catalogue

Red wine grape varieties